Tim Kaiser is a television producer who has worked on such shows as Seinfeld, including the famous "Soup Nazi" episode, as well as Will and Grace. He also produces $#!T my dad says.

Kaiser is a native of Pittsburgh who graduated in 1981 from Riverview High School and in 1985 graduated from Westminster College.

References

External links
 

Living people
American film producers
Year of birth missing (living people)